Novi Itebej (is a village in Serbia. It is situated in the Žitište municipality, in the Central Banat District, Vojvodina province. The village has a Hungarian ethnic majority (81.90%) of Protestant religious affiliation and its population numbering 1,315 people (2002 census).

Historical population

1961: 1,868
1971: 1,750
1981: 1,553
1991: 1,521

See also
List of places in Serbia
List of cities, towns and villages in Vojvodina

References
Slobodan Ćurčić, Broj stanovnika Vojvodine, Novi Sad, 1996.

Populated places in Central Banat District
Hungarian communities in Serbia